Joanna Lockwood is an Australian actress who has played regular roles in various television series.

She is the daughter of British-born Australian actor Johnny Lockwood.

Biography
Lockwood had roles in Crawford series Homicide and Matlock Police she completed a brief stint in the closing episodes of soap opera Number 96 in 1977 (that starred her father) she then played the ongoing lead role of police officer's wife and former stripper Valerie Johnson in police drama series Cop Shop, which began on-air in late 1977. After leaving that series she played Diane Kennedy in the 1988 film To Make a Killing, and had short-term on-going roles in soap opera Sons and Daughters in the mid-1980s, E Street in 1989, A Country Practice in 1993 and Home and Away in 1996.

Filmography

FILM

TELEVISION

References

External links
 

Australian television actresses
Australian people of English descent
Living people
Place of birth missing (living people)
Year of birth missing (living people)
20th-century Australian actresses
21st-century Australian women
21st-century Australian people